Monye is a surname. Notable people with the surname include:

Jude Monye (born 1973), Nigerian sprinter
Precious Monye (born 1974), Nigerian footballer
Ugo Monye (born 1983), English rugby union player and sports commentator

Surnames of Nigerian origin